Yahya Boumediene (Arabic: يحيى بومدين; born 23 May 1990) is a Belgian-Moroccan professional footballer who most recently played as a winger for Swiss club FC Rapperswil-Jona.

Personal life
Boumediene married French former professional tennis champion (Wimbledon 2013) Marion Bartoli in December 2019. Their daughter was born a year later.

References

External links 
 
 Boumediene: "Without football I could have gone wrong, football saved my life" 
 Yahya Boumediene: "Peru plays with grinta" 
 The adventures of Yaya Boumediene in Peru: "Here, football is a religion!"
 Yahya Boumediene is an adventurer on the flank of FC Dordt 
 Yahya Boumediene: "I am a player who fell from the sky"

1990 births
Living people
Belgian footballers
Association football wingers
Belgian sportspeople of Moroccan descent
K. Patro Eisden Maasmechelen players
Royale Union Saint-Gilloise players
R.F.C. Seraing (1922) players
Royal Excel Mouscron players
Ittihad Tanger players
FBC Melgar footballers
FC Dordrecht players
FC Rapperswil-Jona players
Belgian expatriate footballers
Belgian expatriate sportspeople in Morocco
Expatriate footballers in Morocco
Expatriate footballers in Peru
Belgian expatriate sportspeople in the Netherlands
Expatriate footballers in the Netherlands
Belgian expatriate sportspeople in Switzerland
Expatriate footballers in Switzerland